Olympique de Marseille won Division 1 season 1947/1948 of the French Association Football League with 48 points.

Participating teams

Changes from previous season
Teams promoted from 1946–47 French Division 2
 Champions: Sochaux
 Runners-up: Olympique Alès

Teams relegated to 1947–48 French Division 2
 17th placed: Lens
 18th placed: Bordeaux
 19th placed: Le Havre
 20th placed: Rouen

Team list

 Olympique Alès
 AS Cannes
 Lille OSC
 Olympique de Marseille
 FC Metz
 SO Montpellier
 FC Nancy
 RC Paris
 Red Star Olympique
 Stade de Reims
 Stade Rennais UC
 CO Roubaix-Tourcoing
 AS Saint-Étienne
 FC Sète
 FC Sochaux-Montbéliard
 Stade Français FC
 RC Strasbourg
 Toulouse FC

Final table

Promoted from Division 2, who will play in Division 1 season 1948/1949
 OGC Nice: Champion of Division 2
 SR Colmar: Runner-up

Results

Top goalscorers

References
 Division 1 season 1947-1948 at pari-et-gagne.com

Ligue 1 seasons
French
1